Nedimala Grama Niladhari Division is a Grama Niladhari Division of the Dehiwala Divisional Secretariat  of Colombo District  of Western Province, Sri Lanka .  It has Grama Niladhari Division Code 536.

National Zoological Gardens of Sri Lanka  are located within, nearby or associated with Nedimala.

Nedimala is a surrounded by the Kalubovila, Udyanaya, Bellanvila, Kawdana East, Kohuwala and Pepiliyana West  Grama Niladhari Divisions.

Demographics

Ethnicity 

The Nedimala Grama Niladhari Division has a Sinhalese majority (70.2%) and a significant Moor population (15.0%) . In comparison, the Dehiwala Divisional Secretariat (which contains the Nedimala Grama Niladhari Division) has a Sinhalese majority (60.5%), a significant Moor population (20.8%) and a significant Sri Lankan Tamil population (14.5%)

Religion 

The Nedimala Grama Niladhari Division has a Buddhist majority (63.6%) and a significant Muslim population (17.2%) . In comparison, the Dehiwala Divisional Secretariat (which contains the Nedimala Grama Niladhari Division) has a Buddhist majority (54.3%), a significant Muslim population (22.6%) and a significant Hindu population (12.1%)

Gallery

References 

Colombo District
Grama Niladhari divisions of Sri Lanka